Antaramut (also romanized as Antarramut; formerly, K’olageran and Kalagiran) is a town in the Lori Province of Armenia.

References 

Populated places in Lori Province